Glen Artney or Glenartney is a valley in Perthshire, Scotland.

Several ships have been named Glenartney:
, an iron-hulled steamship launched in 1869 and wrecked in 1881
, an iron-hulled steamship launched in 1874 and scrapped in 1893
, a steel-hulled steamship launched in 1911 and sunk by enemy action in 1915
, a steel-hulled motor ship launched in 1915 and sunk by enemy action in 1918
, a steel-hulled motor ship launched in 1939 and scrapped in 1967

References

Ship names